Brandtia is a monotypic genus of amphipod in the Acanthogammaridae family, containing the species Brandtia latissima. Like other members of the family, it is endemic to Lake Baikal. This omnivore is found at depths of  among stones.

D. parasitica, which traditionally has been considered a parasite of Lubomirskiid sponges (gut analyses have shown that it is not), was formerly placed in Brandtia, but it has been moved to Dorogostaiskia. Other species formerly placed in Brandtia have been moved to Gmelinoides (G. fasciatus and G. fasciatoides).

References

Gammaridea
Freshwater crustaceans of Asia